Guliston (before 2016: Qayroqqum or Kayrakkum) is a city in north-western Tajikistan. It is located in Sughd Region, at the western tip of the Kayrakkum Reservoir. Guliston is a city of regional subordination, and is not part of a district. 

The population of Guliston in 2020 is estimated at 18,000 for the city proper and 49,200 including the outlying communities. The city of Guliston also covers the towns Adrasmon, Zarnisor, Konsoy, Navgarzan, Sirdaryo and Choruqdayrron.

See also
List of cities in Tajikistan

References

External links

Populated places in Sughd Region